X Zone is an Indian television series aired on Zee TV from 8 June 1998 to 30 October 2000. It was the Indian version of X-Files Directors like Anurag Basu, Tulsi Ramsay, Shyam Ramsay, Kushan Nandy, Vivek Agnihotri, Imtiaz Ali, Anil Sharma, Ketan Mehta directed the episodes of X Zone. It used to air every Monday at night.

List of episodes

Production
For Woh Kaun Tha this was the first time in 10 years that a TV serial crew had gone deep into the so-called affected areas - Srinagar, Gulmarg and Pahalgam of Kashmir Valley.

Talaash was the story of Kusum who hallucinates about a girl killed in her college and had recurrent nightmares.

Casting

Tanaz Currim in Whitelight  played the wife of a colonel who is possessed by an evil spirit.

Kumar Gaurav played the role of an amnesiac in story 'Sikandar,  who pieces together his past to realize he is the world's most dreaded terrorist'. The story was based on Carlos.

Brijesh Hirjee played Dracula in an episode in 2001.

References

External links

Indian horror fiction television series
Zee TV original programming
Indian anthology television series
1998 Indian television series debuts
2002 Indian television series debuts
Indian television series based on American television series
The X-Files (franchise)